Line 2 of the Thessaloniki Metro, also known as the Kalamaria Extension, is a deep-level underground rapid transit line in Thessaloniki, Greece, connecting  in the west with  in the south-east. Of the line's 16 stations, 11 are also stops for Thessaloniki Metro's Line 1, as they will share tunnels.

Construction costs for the line (between Nomarhia and Mikra) are set at €518 million ($ million).

Line 2 is to be extended further, with an eastern extension towards Macedonia International Airport (4 stations) and a loop extension in the west (9 stations). A priority for Attiko Metro S.A., the company overseeing construction, is the western extension. Originally the two extensions were to be separate lines, but they were merged into a single circular line in 2018.

Stations

References

See also
Thessaloniki Metro
Thessaloniki Metro Line 1
Thessaloniki Urban Transport Organization

Thessaloniki Metro